Martha Garcia was a member of the Arizona House of Representatives from 2003 through 2011. She was first elected to the House in November 2004, and was re-elected twice, in 2006 and 2008.  Although eligible to run for re-election in 2010, she chose not to.

References

Democratic Party members of the Arizona House of Representatives
Living people
Year of birth missing (living people)
Hispanic and Latino American state legislators in Arizona
Hispanic and Latino American women in politics
21st-century American politicians
21st-century American women politicians
Women state legislators in Arizona